Liotrichothrips is a fossil genus of thrips in the family Phlaeothripidae.

Species
 †Liotrichothrips antiquus
 †Liotrichothrips discrepans
 †Liotrichothrips hystrix
 †Liotrichothrips minor

References

Phlaeothripidae
Thrips
Thrips genera